Carteret is a location in Normandy, France, and most if not all uses derive from there. Carteret may refer to:

Places

 Carteret, New Jersey, a borough in Middlesex County, New Jersey, U.S.A., named after George Carteret
 Carteret High School, a four-year comprehensive public high school, the lone secondary school in Carteret School District
 Carteret School District, a comprehensive community public school district in Carteret, New Jersey
 West Carteret, New Jersey, an unincorporated community located within Carteret, New Jersey
 Yeshiva Gedola of Carteret, a Jewish institution based in Carteret, New Jersey
 , a former commune, since 1964 part of Barneville-Carteret, Normandy, France
 , a peninsula near Carteret, Normandy
 , located on Cape Carteret, Normandy
 Carteret County, North Carolina, named after either George Carteret or John Carteret, 2nd Earl Granville
 Cape Carteret, North Carolina, a town within Carteret County
 Carteret Community College, a community college within Carteret County
 Carteret County Home, a historic poorhouse located at Beaufort, Carteret County, North Carolina
 Carteret County News-Times, a newspaper based in Carteret County
 Carteret County Public Schools, a PK–12 graded school district serving Carteret County
 Carteret General Hospital, Morehead City, North Carolina
 National Register of Historic Places listings in Carteret County, North Carolina
 West Carteret High School, a public secondary school located in Morehead City, North Carolina
 Carteret County, a former county in South Carolina 1684–1708; see List of former United States counties
 Carteret Islands, Papua New Guinea, named after Philip Carteret

People
 Carteret (name)

Other uses 
 USS Carteret (APA-70) (1944–46), a Gilliam-class attack transport which served with the U.S. Navy during World War II, named after Carteret County, North Carolina

See also 
 Barneville-Carteret, a commune in Normandy, France which includes the former commune of Carteret, Normandy
 Canton of Barneville-Carteret, a former canton based on Barneville-Carteret
 La Mare de Carteret School, a post-11 secondary school on the island of Guernsey in the Channel Islands